Johann Georg Macasius (1617–1653) was a German physician. He was born in Eger, Bohemia (part of the Holy Roman Empire, now in the Czech Republic).


Education
He received the Medicinae Doctorate from the University of Jena in 1638 under Johannes Musaeus with a thesis entitled De natura et causis externis. In 1640, he received a second Medicinae Doctorate from the University of Jena under Balthasar Widmarcter with a thesis entitled Disputatio de inflammatione.

Books by Macasius
 Johann Georg Macasius and Johann Mathias Nester, Promptuarium materiae medicae, sive Apparatus ad praxim medicam libris duobus adornatus (1654).

References

External links

Brief Macasius bio

1617 births
1653 deaths
University of Jena alumni
Academic staff of the University of Jena
17th-century German physicians
German Bohemian people
17th-century German writers
17th-century German male writers